Galactosylgalactosylxylosylprotein 3-beta-glucuronosyltransferase 2 is an enzyme that in humans is encoded by the B3GAT2 gene.

The product of this gene is a transmembrane protein belonging to the glucuronyltransferase family, and catalyzes the transfer of a beta-1,3 linked glucuronic acid to a terminal galactose in different glycoproteins or glycolipids containing a Gal-beta-1-4GlcNAc or Gal-beta-1-3GlcNAc residue. The encoded protein is involved in the synthesis of the human natural killer-1 (HNK-1) carbohydrate epitope, a sulfated trisaccharide implicated in cellular migration and adhesion in the nervous system.

Use of HNK-1 Antibody for Neural Crest Research
Antibodies raised against the HNK-1 epitope have played a large role in studies of the neural crest, especially in the avian embryo.  The first antibody raised against this epitope was NC-1, which permitted much easier analyses of neural crest migration pathways.  In avians, and especially in other vertebrates, the results of HNK-1 staining should be interpreted with caution as the epitope is not unique to the neural crest.

References

External links
 
 PDBe-KB provides an overview of all the structure information available in the PDB for Human Galactosylgalactosylxylosylprotein 3-beta-glucuronosyltransferase 2  (B3GAT2)

Further reading